Chromosome 11 open reading frame 53 is a protein that in humans is encoded by the C11orf53 gene.  Reduction in C11orf53 gene expression is associated with increased odds of occurrence of colorectal cancer.  Specifically sequence variation (rs3802842) close to the C11orf53 gene locus that lowers the expression of C11orf53 has been observed in the  colonic mucosal cells immediately adjacent to colon cancer tumors.  C11orf53 downregulation aids in cells' ability to survive in acidic conditions, which are typical of the tumor microenvironment.  CRISPR-Cas9 inactivation of C11orf53 in an acute myeloid leukemia cell line made the cells resistant to the BCL2 inhibitor Venetoclax, further supporting a role in cancer predisposition.

Additional roles have been proposed.

References 

Human proteins